{{hatnote|As invalidly established by Hübner in 1819, Acraea also refers to butterflies currently placed in Actinote}}Acraea is a genus of brush-footed butterflies (family Nymphalidae) of the subfamily Heliconiinae. It seems to be highly paraphyletic and has long been used as a "wastebin taxon" to unite about 220 species of anatomically conservative Acraeini. Some phylogenetic studies show that the genus Acraea is monophyletic if Bematistes and Neotropical Actinote are included (see Pierre & Bernaud, 2009). Most species assembled here are restricted to the Afrotropical realm, but some are found in India, Southeast Asia, and Australia.

 Biology 

The eggs are laid in masses; the larvae are rather short, of almost equal thickness throughout, and possessing branched spines on each segment, young larvae group together on a protecting mass of silk; the pupa is slender, with a long abdomen, rather wide and angulated about the insertion of the wings, and suspended by the tail only. A. horta, A. cabira, and A. terpsicore illustrate typical life histories.
The food plants of Acraea caterpillars are usually Urticaceae or, like in most Heliconiinae, Passifloraceae. Some feed on other plants, such as Fabaceae, "Flacourtiaceae", or Violaceae. Their preferred species contain cyanogenic glycosides, which make the larvae and adults poisonous to predators. The aposematic coloration of the adults announces this, and some species are mimicked by less noxious butterflies. At least some "Acraea" are able to produce the toxins themselves. Their flight is slow and flapping.

 Systematics and taxonomy 
That all these species were properly placed in Acraea has never been generally accepted. In 1807, Johan Christian Fabricius established the genus for the garden acraea, described as Papilio horta by Carl Linnaeus in 1764, and its relatives. By and by, an increasing number of species were placed here. As early as 1848, and again in 1887 and the early 1990s, it was attempted to divide the genus into groups of closest relatives, as it was suspected that some "Acraea" might actually be closer to other genera in the tribe Acraeini.

With increasing availability of DNA sequence data, it is confirmed that Acraea as loosely defined does not constitute a monophyletic group. Even before the attempts to split up Acraea in earnest had begun, Jacob Hübner in 1819 suggested to separate species around Acraea serena as Telchinia. This name has been applied to a generally African group whose members usually feed on Urticaceae, and they had already been noted to bear some uncanny resemblances to the American Actinote in anatomical details. Indeed, they seem to be closer relatives of these than of the other butterflies placed in Acraea, which usually feed on Passifloraceae and are at least in part quite close relatives of the African genus Bematistes. Those closest to that genus might warrant separation as Rubraea or Stephenia.

But while several informal species groups have been established, it is not clear which of these are monophyletic and how to split the apparently still paraphyletic genus further. The placement of the garden acraea—the type species—and hence which of the any further subdivisions will get to bear the name Acraea, remains unresolved. As it is traditionally included in the former A. terpsicore group (now A. serena group) and its caterpillars, while polyphagous, do not feed on Urticaceae, it may be that the separation of Telchinia is unwarranted and other proposed genera might be resurrected instead.

There was one major misidentification which still causes confusion today. Acraea terpsicore, described as Papilio terpsicore by Linnaeus in 1758, was held to be the senior synonym of A. serena, described by Fabricius as Papilio serena in 1775. Hence, the former name was commonly used for that African species. But as it turned out, Linnaeus had actually described an Indian species—the well-known tawny coaster. Fabricius in 1793 believed it was new to science and described it again, as Papilio violae. Consequently, it had been long known as A. violae. It was also recognized that Fabricius' little-studied P. serena was none other than the orange acraea. For this, the name A. eponina, from the Papilio eponina established in the 1780 issue of Pieter Cramer's De uitlandsche Kapellen, had been used all the time. Another instance of the confusion rife in this genus is exemplified by Boisduval's Acraea manjaca.

These developments come from two papers written by J. Pierre and D. Bernaud.

Species
Since the proposed phylogenetic sequence of the species groups is almost certainly incorrect for a large part, the groups are simply listed alphabetically.

J. Pierre & D. Bernaud have published a complete systematic and synonymic list.'Acraea acrita species group Acraea acrita – fiery acraea
 Acraea annonae
 Acraea bellona
 Acraea chaeribula
 Acraea eltringhamiana
 Acraea guluensis
 Acraea loranae
 Acraea lualabae
 Acraea manca
 Acraea pudorina – Kenyan fiery acraea
 Acraea utengulensis – Tanzanian fiery acraeaAcraea andromacha species group (close to part of A. terpsicore group?)
 Acraea andromacha – small greasy, glasswingAcraea anemosa species group Acraea anemosa – broad-bordered acraea
 Acraea pseudolycia
 Acraea turnaAcraea aureola species group Acraea aureola (= onerata) (cepheus group)Acraea bonasia species group (close to A. oberthuri and A. rahira groups? Paraphyletic?)

 Acraea acerata – small yellow-banded legionnaire, falls acraea 
 Acraea alicia
 Acraea bonasia
 Acraea burgessi
 Acraea cabira – yellow-banded acraea
 Acraea serena – dancing acraea
 Acraea eponina – orange acraea or small orange acraea 
 Acraea excelsior
 Acraea goetzei
 Acraea karschi
 Acraea lumiri
 Acraea rangatana
 Acraea hecqui
 Acraea pierrei
 Acraea sotikensis – Sotik acraea, Sotika legionnaire
 Acraea uvui – tiny acraea
 Acraea venturaAcraea caecilia species group (close to A. cepheus and A. egina groups?)

 Acraea aglaonice – clear-spotted acraea
 Acraea mirabilis – marvelous acraea
 Acraea miranda – desert acraea, Somali acraea
 Acraea asboloplintha – black-winged acraea,  black-winged legionnaire
 Acraea atergatis
 Acraea atatis
 Acraea axina – little acraea
 Acraea braesia
 Acraea caecilia – pink legionnaire (type species of Stephenia)
 Acraea caldarena – black-tipped acraea, black tip acraea
 Acraea doubledayi
 Acraea ella
 Acraea equatorialis
 Acraea intermediodes
 Acraea leucopyga
 Acraea lygus – lygus acraea
 Acraea marnois (= Acraea caecilia)
 Acraea natalica – Natal acraea, Natal legionnaire
 Acraea oncaea – window acraea, window legionnaire
 Acraea pseudegina
 Acraea pudorella
 Acraea rhodesiana
 Acraea stenobea – suffused acraea
 Acraea lyci
 Acraea sykesi – Sykes' acraeaAcraea cepheus species group (close to A. caecilia and A. egina groups?)

 Acraea abdera
 Acraea asema
 Acraea atolmis
 Acraea bailundensis
 Acraea buettneri
 Acraea cepheus
 Acraea bergeriana
 Acraea chambezi
 Acraea diogenes
 Acraea guillemei
 Acraea lapidorum
 Acraea lofua
 Acraea mansya
 Acraea nohara – light red acraea
 Acraea dondoensis
 Acraea onerata
 Acraea periphanes
 Acraea petraea – blood-red acraea, blood acraea
 Acraea punctellata
 Acraea rohlfsi
 Acraea violarum – speckled red acraeaAcraea circeis species group (close to A. masamba)

 Acraea buschbecki
 Acraea circeis – white legionnaire (type species of Gnesia)
 Acraea conradti
 Acraea grosvenori
 Acraea kuekenthali
 Acraea melanoxantha
 Acraea newtoni
 Acraea ntebiae
 Acraea oreas
 Acraea orina – Orina legionnaire
 Acraea orinata
 Acraea parrhasia – yellow-veined legionnaire
 Acraea pelopeia
 Acraea peneleos
 Acraea penelope – Penelope's acraea, Penelope's legionnaire
 Acraea perenna
 Acraea semivitrea (type species of Alacria)
 Acraea translucida
 Acraea ungemachi
 Acraea vumbuiAcraea egina species group (close to A. caecilia and A. cepheus groups?)

 Acraea egina – elegant legionnaire (type species of Rubraea)
 Acraea medea Acraea encedon species group (close to A. jodutta and A. pharsalus groups?) – common acraea or white-barred acraea or encedon acraea

 Acraea encedana – Pierre's acraea 
 Acraea encedon – common acraea, white-barred legionnaire (type species of Hyalites)
 Acraea necoda
 Acraea encodaAcraea issoria species group (a rather distinct lineage?)

 Acraea issoria – yellow coster (type species of Pareba)Acraea jodutta species group (close to A. encedon and A. pharsalus groups?)

 Acraea actinotina
 Acraea acuta
 Acraea alciope
 Acraea alciopoides
 Acraea amicitiae
 Acraea ansorgei
 Acraea aurivillii
 Acraea baxteri
 Acraea disjuncta
 Acraea esebria – dusky acraea
 Acraea comor
 Acraea insularis
 Acraea jodutta – jodutta legionnaire
 Acraea johnstoni
 Acraea lycoa – lycoa legionnaire (type species of Planema)
 Acraea masaris
 Acraea niobe
 Acraea safieAcraea masamba species group (close to A. circeis?)

 Acraea aubyni – Aubyn Rogers' acraea
 Acraea cinerea – grey acraea
 Acraea fornax
 Acraea igola – dusky-veined acraea
 Acraea masamba
 Acraea quirinalis
 Acraea sambavae
 Acraea siliana
 Acraea simulata (tentatively placed here; Bematistes?)
 Acraea strattipoclesAcraea oberthuri species group (close to A. bonasia group?)

 Acraea althoffi – Althoff's acraea
 Acraea bergeri
 Acraea oberthueri
 Acraea pseudepaeaAcraea pentapolis species group (close to A. circeis and A. masamba groups?)

 Acraea pentapolis – musanga legionnaire
 Acraea vesperalis
 Acraea obeira
 Acraea burni – pale-yellow acraea (close to A. andromacha group?)
 Acraea orestia
 Acraea liaAcraea pharsalus species group (close to A. encedon and A. jodhutta groups?)

 Acraea pharsalus – familiar legionnaire
 Acraea vuillotiAcraea rahira species group (close to A. bonasia group?)

 Acraea anacreon – large orange acraea, orange acraea (type species of Auracraea)
 Acraea anacreontica
 Acraea bomba
 Acraea calida
 Acraea guichardi
 Acraea lusinga
 Acraea induna – induna acraea (included in "Telchinia")
 Acraea kaduna
 Acraea parei
 Acraea alalonga – long-winged orange acraea (included in "Telchinia")
 Acraea mirifica
 Acraea rahira – marsh acraea
 Acraea speciosa
 Acraea wigginsi
 Acraea zitjaAcraea satis species group Acraea rabbaiae – clear-wing acraea, clearwing legionnaire
 Acraea satis – east coast acraea
 Acraea zonataA. terpsicore group Acraea admatha – Hewitson's glassy legionnaire
 Acraea boopis – rainforest acraea
 Acraea endoscota (close to A. andromacha group?)
 Acraea kappa
 Acraea kia
 Acraea kinduana
 Acraea camaena (close to part of A. andromacha group?)
 Acraea cuva
 Acraea dammii
 Acraea eltringhami
 Acraea eugenia
 Acraea hamata
 Acraea horta – garden acraea (type species of Acraea)
 Acraea hova
 Acraea igati (type species of Solenites)
 Acraea insignis
 Acraea leucographa
 Acraea machequena – machequena acraea
 Acraea mahela
 Acraea matuapa
 Acraea neobule – wandering donkey acraea, wandering donkey (close to A. zetes group?)
 Acraea brainei
 Acraea quirina – common glassy legionnaire (close to A. andromacha group?)
 Acraea ranavalona (type species of Phanopeltis)
 Acraea rileyi
 Acraea rogersi – Rogers's large legionnaire (a rather distinct lineage?)
 Acraea serena – dancing acraea, small orange legionnaire (formerly misidentified as A. eponina, A. terpsicore; type species of Telchinia)Acraea terpsicore species group (formerly A. violae group)

 Acraea terpsicore – tawny coster (formerly A. violae)Acraea zetes species group (might include part of A. serena group; a very distinct lineage?)

 Acraea acara – acara acraea
 Acraea barberi – Barber's acraea
 Acraea chilo
 Acraea hypoleuca
 Acraea magnifica
 Acraea trimeni – Trimen's acraea
 Acraea zetesSpecies group undetermined Acraea acutipennis
 Acraea alticola
 Acraea cerasa – tree top acraea
 Acraea ducarmei ("epaea group")
 Acraea humilis
 Acraea kalinzu
 Acraea kraka – kraka glassy acraea
 Acraea macarista
 Acraea mima
 Acraea odzalae
 Acraea omrora
 Acraea oscari
 Acraea overlaeti
 Acraea peetersi
 Acraea polis (close to A. circeis, A. masamba and A. pentapolis groups?)
 Acraea pseudatolmis
 Acraea pullula
 Acraea punctimarginea
 Acraea silia
 Acraea simulator
 Acraea iturina – Ituri glassy acraea
 Acraea toruna
 Acraea turlini
 Acraea viviana
 Acraea zoumi

Some other species formerly in Acraea have now been definitely assigned to other genera, e.g. Bematistes.

 Footnotes 

 References 
  (2004): Butterflies and Moths of the World: Generic Names and their Type-species. Version of 2004-NOV-05. Retrieved 2008-AUG-15.
  (2007): Markku Savela's Lepidoptera and some other life forms – Acraea. Version of 2007-JUN-05. Retrieved 2008-AUG-15.
 Seitz, A. Die Gross-Schmetterlinge der Erde 13: Die Afrikanischen Tagfalter. Plate XIII 53 et seq.
 Seitz, A. Die Gross-Schmetterlinge der Erde 13: Die Afrikanischen Tagfalter. Text (in German)
  (2008): Phylogenetic relationships of butterflies of the tribe Acraeini (Lepidoptera, Nymphalidae, Heliconiinae) and the evolution of host plant use.  Mol. Phylogenet. Evol. 46'(2): 515–531.  PDF fulltext
  (2005): Field Guide to Butterflies of South Africa. Cape Town: Struik Publishers.

 Further reading 
 Eltringham, H., 1912 A Monograph of the African species of the Genus Acraea, Fab., with a supplement on those of the Oriental Region. Transactions of the Royal Entomological Society of London Volume 60, Issue 1, pages 1–369, July 1912 pdf
 Pierre J. & Bernaud D., 2009. Butterflies of the World, Part 31, Nymphalidae XVI et Supplément 16, Acraea sous-genre Actinote. Erich Bauer. Thomas Frankenbach, Goecke & Evers, Keltern, Germany 
 Pierre J. & Bernaud D., 2013. Butterflies of the World, Part 39, Nymphalidae XXIII et Supplément 22, Acraea sous-genre Acraea'' . Erich Bauer. Thomas Frankenbach, Goecke & Evers, Keltern, Germany

External links 

 Le Site des Acraea de Dominique Bernaud
 Systematic and synonymic list (Pierre & Bernaud)
 Alphabetic list (Pierre & Bernaud)
 African description references (Pierre & Bernaud)
 Acraea terpsicore rehabilitation paper
 Acraea serena rehabilitation paper
 Acraea epaea group (ex Bematistes) revision paper
 Acraea at EOL
 African Butterfly Database especially bibliography
 Acraea at Pteron image overview

 
Acraeini
Nymphalidae genera
Taxa named by Johan Christian Fabricius